Extraordinary Ways is an album by Canadian electronic music project Conjure One. Released in August 2005, it was the second album for the project headed by Rhys Fulber.

Release and promotion
The album has been released with the Copy Control protection system in some regions.

ACIDplanet.com released the complete multitracks to "Face the Music" in a remix competition that ran from December 2005 through January 2006. The winning remix by Erick Muise received inclusion on the promo release of the "Face the Music" single.

Track listing

Personnel

Conjure One
 Rhys Fulber – programming, vocals (5, 6), production

Additional musicians
 Poe – vocals (1, 4, 7)
 Tiff Lacey – vocals (2)
 Joanna Stevens – vocals (3, 8)
 Leah Randi – vocals (6)
 Chemda – vocals (9, 10)

Charts

Album

Singles

Extraordinay Way

Face the Music

References

2005 albums
Conjure One albums
Nettwerk Records albums